Oscar Astarloa Uriarte (Basque:Oskar Astarloa, born 6 September 1974 in Elgoibar) is a Spanish former rugby union player and currently coach. He plays as an open-side lock and flanker. He currently coaches Spain national under-19 rugby union team.

Career
His first international cap was during a match against Germany, at Heidelberg, on 26 April 1998. He was part of the 1999 Rugby World Cup roster, playing all the three matches as first choice. His last cap was during a match against Georgia, at Tbilisi, on 28 October 2006. He also took part at the 2001 Rugby World Cup Sevens in Argentina.

References

External links
 

1974 births
Aviron Bayonnais players
Living people
Rugby union players from the Basque Country (autonomous community)
Spanish rugby union players
Rugby union locks
Sportspeople from Gipuzkoa
Spain international rugby union players
People from Elgoibar
Spanish expatriate rugby union players
Spanish expatriate sportspeople in France
Expatriate rugby union players in France